Zohair El Yassini (born 17 November, 1979) is a Dutch politician from the People's Party for Freedom and Democracy.

References

See also 

1979 births
Living people
21st-century Dutch politicians
Members of the House of Representatives (Netherlands)
People's Party for Freedom and Democracy politicians
People from Utrecht (city)